Erik Holmberg (13 November 1908 – 1 February 2000) was a Swedish astronomer and cosmologist. He is most famous for his work in the effects of interacting galaxies. This research showed that galaxies that came near each other would likely combine to form a larger galaxy.

Personal life
In 1908, Holmberg was born to Malcolm and Anna Holmberg in Skillingaryd, Sweden. In 1947 he married Martha Asdahl. They had one daughter named Osa, who was born in 1953. He died on 1 February 2000 in Gothenburg, at the age of 91.

Scientific work
In 1941, Holmberg performed arguably the first N-body simulation on the dynamics of interacting galaxies. In order to simulate the effect, he constructed an array of 37 lightbulbs. Using photocells, he measured the simulated force of gravity. Over time, the galaxies moved closer toward each other. He also concluded in a later experiment that elliptical galaxies are generally older than spiral galaxies, among other discoveries.
The Holmberg radius, a measure for the size of a galaxy on the sky, is named after him.
The Holmberg effect is also named after his observation that the satellite galaxies of a disk galaxy tend to be located along the disk galaxy minor axis. The evidences of such effect remain however debated.

See also
Holmberg II
Holmberg IX
Holmberg 15A

References

20th-century Swedish astronomers
Swedish cosmologists
1908 births
2000 deaths
Members of the Royal Swedish Academy of Sciences